Donald Irvin Hasenmayer (April 4, 1927 – January 28, 2020) was an American professional baseball player. He was an infielder over parts of two seasons (1945–46) with the Philadelphia Phillies. For his career, he compiled a .100 batting average in 30 at-bats, with one run batted in. He was born in Roslyn, Pennsylvania and attended Abington Senior High School. He was a navy veteran of World War II. Hasenmayer died on January 28, 2020.

References

External links

1927 births
2020 deaths
People from Abington Township, Montgomery County, Pennsylvania
Military personnel from Pennsylvania
Philadelphia Phillies players
Major League Baseball second basemen
Major League Baseball third basemen
Baseball players from Pennsylvania
Minor league baseball managers
Wilmington Blue Rocks (1940–1952) players
Utica Blue Sox players
Terre Haute Phillies players
Vandergrift Pioneers players
Portsmouth Cubs players
Norfolk Tars players
Birmingham Barons players
United States Navy personnel of World War II